Alistair Brown may refer to:

Ali Brown (born 1970), English cricketer  
Alistair Brown (footballer, born 1951), Scottish footballer (Leicester City, West Bromwich Albion)
Alistair Brown (footballer, born 1957), Scottish footballer (Dumbarton FC)
Alistair Brown (footballer, born 1985), Scottish football goalkeeper (Hibernian FC)